Martin Rappe (born 10 July 1993) is a German former figure skater. He is the 2014 CS Ice Challenge bronze medalist, 2014 Hellmut Seibt Memorial champion, 2012 Bavarian Open silver medalist, and 2012 German national bronze medalist. He competed at the 2012 and 2013 World Junior Championships, placing 11th both times.

Programs

Results
CS: Challenger Series; JGP: Junior Grand Prix

References

 2010 German Junior Men's Figure Skating Championships
 2009 German Junior Men's Figure Skating Championships
 2008 German Junior Men's Figure Skating Championships
 2007 German Junior Men's Figure Skating Championships
 2006 German Youth Men's Figure Skating Championships

External links

 
 Martin Rappe at Tracings

German male single skaters
1993 births
Living people
Sportspeople from Chemnitz